Maurizio Dipietro (born 22 April 1963 in Enna) is an Italian politician.

Former member of the Democrats of the Left, he joined the Democratic Party in 2007 but he left it three years later. He ran as an independent for Mayor of Enna at the 2015 Italian local elections supported by a centre-right coalition. He won and took office as mayor on 17 June 2015.

Dipietro joined again the Democratic Party in 2017 and left it in 2019 to join Matteo Renzi's new party Italia Viva.

See also
2015 Italian local elections
List of mayors of Enna

References

External links
 

1963 births
Living people
Mayors of places in Sicily
People from Enna
Democrats of the Left politicians
Democratic Party (Italy) politicians
Italia Viva politicians